Eagles Rest Peak is in the northern Teton Range, Grand Teton National Park, Wyoming. The peak is located west of and across Jackson Lake from Colter Bay Village. Waterfalls Canyon is to the north of the peak and Snowshoe Canyon lies to the south.

References

Mountains of Grand Teton National Park
Mountains of Wyoming
Mountains of Teton County, Wyoming